Elektrolytdatenbank Regensburg (abridged ELDAR) is a compilation of thermodynamic data, bibliography and properties of electrolytes and their solutions.

History
The gathering of data has begun since 1981. It is a member of DECHEMA and associate of Dortmund Data Bank.

Content
Densities, dielectric constants
Thermal expansion and compressibility data
Electrical conductivity data
Solubility data
Activity and excess molar quantity data

External links
official site

Chemical databases